Grousset is a French surname. Notable people with the surname include:

Maxime Grousset (born 1999), French swimmer
Paschal Grousset (1844–1909), French politician, journalist, and writer
René Grousset (1885–1952), French historian

See also
Rousset (surname)

French-language surnames